Cape Campbell Lighthouse is a lighthouse at Cape Campbell in the Marlborough region of the South Island of New Zealand. It is owned and operated by Maritime New Zealand.
The original lighthouse at this site was first lit on 1 August 1870. However, this lighthouse was constructed of timber, and in 1898 these timbers were found to be decaying. This led to the construction of the current cast iron tower, which began operating in October 1905.

The light was originally fuelled by oil. In 1938 the oil lamp was replaced with an electric one powered by a local diesel generator. This was subsequently replaced by a connection to the mains grid in the 1960s. The light was fully automated in 1986 and is now managed from a control room in Wellington.

It featured in the 2016 film The Light Between Oceans.

See also 

 List of lighthouses in New Zealand

References 

A youngsters vision of the Cape Campbell Lighthouse and surrounds is in the book, The Tall White Tower. (Published by Terry Cole, nephew of the author, Eric Creamer.

External links 
 
 
 Lighthouses of New Zealand Maritime New Zealand

Lighthouses completed in 1870
Lighthouses in New Zealand
Transport buildings and structures in the Marlborough Region